Vittorio Triarico Tateo (born 24 May 1989) is an Italian footballer who plays as a forward.

Career

Lecce
Born in Mesagne, Apulia region, Triarico started his career at Apulian club Lecce. Triarico made his league and Serie B debut during the 2006–07 Serie B season. He followed the club as they were promoted to Serie A, the top Italian division, and made his Serie A debut during 2007–08 Serie A season.

Triarico was signed by Lega Pro Prima Divisione club Crotone in summer 2008. The club won promotion to the second highest league division of Italy, the Serie B, in 2009.

He remained in the third highest level of Italian football for the 2009–10 season, playing for Taranto. On 9 August 2010 Triarico and Ingrosso were signed by Paganese. In summer 2011 Triarico was signed by Campobasso, from the second division of Italian third highest league.

L'Aquila
Triarico remained in the fourth highest level of Italian football, playing for L'Aquila in 2012–13 Lega Pro Seconda Divisione season, in a temporary deal. The club won promotion to the 2013–14 Lega Pro Prima Divisione. On 7 August 2013 L'Aquila signed Triarico in a co-ownership deal. L'Aquila acquired Triarico outright by submitting a higher bid to the office of Lega Pro.

Matera
On 4 August 2018, he joined Serie C club Matera.

Bisceglie
On 31 January 2019, he signed with Bisceglie.

Monopoli
On 21 July 2019 he joined Monopoli on a 2-year contract. On 23 September 2020, his Monopoli contract was terminated by mutual consent.

Bitonto
On 14 October 2020 he joined Bitonto.

Brindisi
On 21 December 2021 he joined Brindisi.

References

External links
 AIC profile (data by football.it)  
 

Italian footballers
U.S. Lecce players
F.C. Crotone players
Taranto F.C. 1927 players
Paganese Calcio 1926 players
L'Aquila Calcio 1927 players
Matera Calcio players
Virtus Francavilla Calcio players
A.S. Bisceglie Calcio 1913 players
S.S. Monopoli 1966 players
U.S. Bitonto players
Serie B players
Serie C players
Italy youth international footballers
Footballers from Apulia
People from Mesagne
1989 births
Living people
Association football forwards
Sportspeople from the Province of Brindisi